Suzanne Fagence Cooper is a British non-fiction writer who has written extensively on the Pre-Raphaelites and Victorian women.

Education and career
Fagence Cooper received a BA in history from Oxford University and spent 12 years as a curator of the Victorian collections at the Victoria & Albert Museum where she co-curated The Victorian Vision exhibition in 2001. She is an honorary visiting fellow of the University of York.

As well as writing, Fagence Cooper is a design consultant and has worked with the BBC and Channel 4 and was a historical consultant for the 2013 film The Invisible Woman. She was a contributor to Fred Dibnah's World of Steam, Steel and Stone for BBC television, including providing a factual, historical perspective on the way Victorian lives can be presented in museums. She is also a Companion of the Guild of St George.

Personal life
Fagence Cooper lives near York and is married to John Cooper. They have two daughters, Rosalind and Beatrice.

Selected publications
Victorians at Home and Abroad. London: V & A Publications, 2001.  (With Paul Atterbury)
The Victorian Woman. London: V & A Publications, 2001. 
Pre-raphaelite Art in the Victoria and Albert Museum. London: V & A Publications, 2003. 
The Model Wife: Effie, Ruskin and Millais. London, Gerald Duckworth & Co., 2010. 
Effie: The Passionate Lives of Effie Gray, John Ruskin and John Everett Millais. St. Martin's Press, 2011.

See also
Effie Gray

References

External links
Official website
Suzanne Fagence Cooper talking about Effie Gray

Living people
People associated with the Victoria and Albert Museum
Year of birth missing (living people)
Alumni of the University of Oxford
British women writers
Guild of St George